Ian Myron Quartermain (born 30 December 1940), is an Australian former sailor who competed in the 1964 Summer Olympics.

References

1940 births
Living people
Australian male sailors (sport)
Olympic sailors of Australia
Sailors at the 1964 Summer Olympics – Dragon
20th-century Australian people